Mahmoud El-Saadany, also transliterated as Mahmud Al-Saadani or al or el Saadani or Sa'dani (November 20, 1928 - May 4, 2010) was an Egyptian satirical writer and journalist. He is considered one of the pioneers of satirical writing in the Arab press. He is the older brother of the actor Salah El-Saadany. He participated in editing and founding a large number of Arab newspapers and magazines in Egypt and abroad. He headed the editorship of Sabah Al-Khair, an Egyptian magazine in the sixties. As a Nassirist, he also participated in political life during the reign of President Gamal Abdel Nasser, and was imprisoned during the reign of Anwar Sadat after he was convicted of participating in a coup attempt.

He issued and headed the editorship of the July 23 magazine in his exile in London. He returned to Egypt from his self-imposed exile in 1982 after the assassination of Sadat and was received by President Mubarak. He had relations with a number of Arab rulers such as Muammar Gaddafi and Saddam Hussein. He retired from journalism and public life in 2006 due to illness.

Early life and career 
Mahmoud Othman Ibrahim El-Saadany grew up in the Giza district of Greater Cairo. At the beginning of his journalistic career, he worked in a number of small newspapers and magazines that were published on Muhammad Ali Street in Cairo, after which he worked in the “Al-Kashkul” magazine, which was published by Mamoun Al-Shinnawi until its closure. Then he worked as a freelancer for some newspapers, such as Al-Masry newspaper, the mouthpiece of the Wafd Party. He also worked at Dar Al-Hilal. He also published, along with the cartoonist Toghan, a comic magazine that was shut down after a few issues.

Works 
El-Saadany's works were all in Arabic. In his books, he mainly used literary Arabic blended with Egyptian colloquialism as well of many satirical expressions he coined himself. 

As of the end of 2022, none of his works were known to be published in any language other than Arabic. His books include 

 Egypt Revisited
 Amreeka ya Weeka
 A Donkey from the East
 Memoirs of the Mischievous Boy
 An Idler in the Lands of the African

References 

Egyptian novelists
Egyptian male short story writers
Egyptian short story writers
Egyptian socialists
20th-century novelists
Egyptian male writers
20th-century short story writers